In mathematics, Lemoine's problem is a certain construction problem in elementary plane geometry posed by the French mathematician Émile Lemoine (1840–1912) in 1868.   The problem was published as Question 864 in Nouvelles Annales de Mathématiques (Series 2, Volume 7 (1868), p 191). The chief interest in the problem is that a discussion of the solution of the problem by Ludwig Kiepert published in Nouvelles Annales de Mathématiques (series  2, Volume  8 (1869), pp 40–42) contained a description of a hyperbola which is now known as the Kiepert hyperbola.

Statement of the problem
The question published by Lemoine poses the following construction problem:
Given one vertex of each of the equilateral triangles placed on the sides of a triangle, construct the original triangle.

Ludwig Kiepert's solution

Kiepert establishes the validity of his construction by proving a few lemmas.

Problem
Let A1, B1, C1 be the vertices of the equilateral triangles placed on the sides of a triangle ABC. Given A1, B1, C1 construct A, B, C.

Lemma 1 
If on the three sides of an arbitrary triangle ABC, one describes equilateral triangles ABC1, ACB1, BCA1, then the line segments AA1, BB1, CC1 are equal, they concur in a point P, and the angles they form one another are equal to 60°.

Lemma 2
If on A1B1C1 one makes the same construction as that on ABC, there  will have three equilateral triangles A1B1C2, A1C1B2, B1C1A2, three equal line segments A1A2, B1B2, C1C2, which will also concur at the point P.

Lemma 3
 A, B, C are respectively the midpoints of A1A2, B1B2, C1C2.

Solution
Describe on the segments A1B1, A1C1, B1C1 the equilateral triangles A1B1C2, A1C1B2, B1C1A2, respectively.
The midpoints of A1A2, B1B2, C1C2 are, respectively, the vertices A, B, C of the required triangle.

Other solutions
Several other people in addition to Kiepert submitted their solutions  during 1868–9, including  Messrs Williere (at Arlon), Brocard, Claverie (Lycee de Clermont), Joffre (Lycee Charlemagne), Racine (Lycee de Poitiers), Augier (Lycee de Caen), V. Niebylowski, and L. Henri Lorrez.
Kiepert's solution was more complete than the others.

References

Triangle problems